The Potable Water and Basic Sanitation Regulation Commission (CRA) is a regulatory agency of the Government of Colombia in charge of regulating the water supply and sanitation in Colombia, including the potable and public water distribution, sewage and waste management services. Its mission is to create and preserve the necessary conditions to provide sanitary services by regulating the organizations and agencies that provide this services, may them be public or private; its duties include establishing criteria for granting subsidies to low-income users and using various methods to calculate fix rates. It was created in 1994, and is currently ascribed to the Ministry of Housing, City and Territory.

See also
 Superintendency of Public Services

References

Ministry of Housing, City and Territory (Colombia)
Government agencies established in 1994
Water supply and sanitation in Colombia
1994 establishments in Colombia